Steppage gait (High stepping, Neuropathic gait) is a form of gait abnormality characterised by foot drop or ankle equinus due to loss of dorsiflexion. The foot hangs with the toes pointing down, causing the toes to scrape the ground while walking, requiring someone to lift the leg higher than normal when walking.

Foot drop can be caused by damage to the deep peroneal nerve.

Conditions associated with a steppage gait
 Foot drop
 Charcot–Marie–Tooth disease
 Polio
 Multiple sclerosis
 Syphilis
 Guillain–Barré syndrome
 Spinal disc herniation
 Anterior Compartment Muscle Atrophy
 Deep fibular nerve injury
 Spondylolisthesis
 Slipped Femoral Epiphysis
 ALS/PLS

References

External links
 A video of a neuropathic gait

Gait abnormalities